Mandana Karimi (born Manizeh Karimi; on 19 May 1988) is an Iranian actress and model based in India. After working on several successful modelling projects around the world, she appeared as a lead in the Bollywood film, Bhaag Johnny. She participated in the popular reality TV show, Bigg Boss 9 and became the 2nd runner up in 2015.

Early life 
Karimi was born on 19 May 1988 in Tehran, Iran, into a Muslim family. Her father has Iranian and Indian ancestry and her mother is a Persian. She was raised in Tehran.

Career 
Karimi started her career as an air hostess, and later quit that job to pursue a career in modelling. In 2010, after working on various international modelling projects, she came to Mumbai for three months on a modelling contract.

Karimi has done TV commercials with Shahrukh Khan, Saif Ali Khan, Kareena Kapoor, Shahid Kapoor and Arjun Kapoor.

In February 2015, she made a guest appearance in the film Roy. Later that year, in September, her movie Bhaag Johnny was released. She also appeared in the October 2015 film, Main Aur Charles, where she played the role of Charles Sobraj's assistant. Karimi's next film, Kyaa Kool Hain Hum 3, a sex comedy, was released on 22 January 2016.

Karimi was a contestant in the reality TV show, Bigg Boss 9, where a group of celebrities from various walks of life live together in a large house. One of the contestants is eliminated every week, based on public votes. The show went on air in October 2015 on Colors. She was one of the three finalists of the season and ended up as a runner-up.

In 2018, she joined Star Plus's Ishqbaaaz as Nancy.

In October 2018, Karimi accused Umesh Ghadge the director of Kyaa Kool Hain Hum 3 of sexual harassment. 

Mandana participated in an Indian TV reality show called Lock-Upp.

Personal life 
Karimi speaks Persian, English and Hindi.

In July 2016, Karimi got engaged to her boyfriend, Gaurav Gupta, an Indian businessman from Mumbai. The couple married in court in early March the following year, which was followed by a lavish Hindu wedding in March 2017.

In July 2017, Karimi filed a domestic violence case against her husband and his family, which she later withdrew in hopes of saving her marriage. They got divorced in 2021.

Filmography

Films

Television

Web series

References

External links 

 
 
 

Living people
1988 births
People from Tehran
Iranian film actresses
Actresses in Hindi cinema
Iranian diaspora film people
Iranian female models
Iranian television actresses
Iranian expatriates in India
Expatriate actresses in India
Iranian people of Indian descent
Iranian emigrants to India
Violence against women in India
Bigg Boss (Hindi TV series) contestants
Iranian former Muslims
Converts to Hinduism from Islam